Rita Margaret Johnston (born April 22, 1935; née Leichert) is a Canadian politician in British Columbia. Johnston became the first female premier in Canadian history when she succeeded Bill Vander Zalm in 1991 to become the 29th premier of British Columbia, serving for seven months.

The daughter of John Leichert and Annie Chyzzy, she was educated in Vancouver. In 1951, she married George Johnston.

Much of her early life was spent running a trailer park in the city of Surrey, British Columbia.

Political career

Johnston first entered politics as a city councillor in Surrey. In 1983, she was elected as a member of the Legislative Assembly of British Columbia as part of the Social Credit Party, representing the provincial riding of Surrey.

She was reelected in 1986 in the newly-created riding of Surrey-Newton and became a cabinet minister under Premier Bill Vander Zalm, serving in various portfolios. She had previously served under Vander Zalm when she was a councilor and he was the mayor of Surrey.

Vander Zalm appointed Johnston deputy premier in 1990. When Vander Zalm resigned, on April 2, 1991, caucus selected her as interim leader over attorney general Russell Fraser by a vote of 21–17. As such, she was appointed premier on April 2, 1991, making her Canada's first female first minister.

At a Social Credit party convention in July 1991, she was formally elected leader of the Socreds in an upset, narrowly defeating the frontrunner Grace McCarthy. However, she had little time to implement any new programs since she faced a statutory general election in October.

The party was also bitterly divided because of the leadership contest, and it had little time to repair the breach before the writs were dropped.

Johnston's long association with the scandal-plagued Vander Zalm significantly hampered her prospects of winning election in her own right, and she was soundly defeated by the New Democratic Party, led by Mike Harcourt. Moreover, many moderate Socreds switched their support to the previously moribund BC Liberals. The Socreds lost more than half of their popular vote from 1986 and were cut down to seven seats, falling to third place in the Legislative Assembly behind the NDP and Liberals.

Johnston herself lost her own seat to the NDP's Penny Priddy by over 10 points, and all but seven members of her cabinet were defeated. Harcourt later said that he preferred facing Johnston rather than McCarthy, believing McCarthy would have been a tougher opponent in a general election.

Johnston resigned as leader of the Social Credit Party on January 11, 1992 and was replaced by McCarthy. After her defeat, Johnston retired from politics and has had a low public profile.

She returned to public life in 2009 as an advisor for the British Columbia Conservative Party.

References 
biography at collections canada

1935 births
British Columbia Social Credit Party leaders
British Columbia Social Credit Party MLAs
Canadian female first ministers
Deputy premiers of British Columbia
Living people
Members of the Executive Council of British Columbia
People from Melville, Saskatchewan
People from Surrey, British Columbia
Premiers of British Columbia
Surrey, British Columbia city councillors
Women government ministers of Canada
Women MLAs in British Columbia